The American Literary Review is an American national biannual literary magazine of poetry, fiction, and nonfiction. Since its Fall 2013 issue, ALR has been an online digital publication.  Print publications are cataloged under .

History 
ALR was founded  years ago, in 1990, by the creative writing faculty of the Department of English of the University of North Texas and the now bygone Center for Texas Studies at the University of North Texas. The Center for Texas Studies, at that time, was led by James Ward Lee, PhD (born 1931), longtime professor of English at UNT, Department Chair, and a prolific writer, and A.C. Greene, an author and former newspaper editor, notably of the Dallas Times Herald. ALR published the first issue in the spring of 1990. Lee edited the first two issues in the spring and fall of 1990. In the first issue, he wrote an editorial expressing hope that the name and tagline, "American Literary Review: A National Journal of Poems and Stories, will prove to be neither pretentious nor presumptuous."

The founding objective was to showcase a range of genres and styles from emerging and veteran writers. To encourage freedom of expression, risk-taking, and experimentation, Lee said that ALR would not publish scholarly articles. That sentiment is not too dissimilar from that of the late Theodore Weiss, founding editor of the former and influential Quarterly Review of Literature, who also felt that scholarly articles and criticism might stifle writers. ALR's third issue (spring 1991, vol. 2, issue 1) was edited by poet and faculty member Scott Cairns. The first issue received more than 160 submissions.

The printed issues, prior to 2013, were typically 120 pages, digest size, perfect-bound with color card cover featuring a photo submission.

In 2004, NewPages characterized ALR as having roughly a 2:1 poetry to fiction ratio, with a casual touch of both traditional and experimental forms.

In 2020, ALR announced that "due to institutional budget cuts as a result of grappling with the changes brought on by the COVID-19 pandemic, we are forced to go on a temporary hiatus."

Prize winners 
The ALR awards three annual prizes, for a poem, a short story, and an essay.

Uncategorized
 Joshua Poteat

Nonfiction
 Maureen Stanton
 2008: Karin Forfota Poklen
 2009: Julie Marie Wade
 2010: Sabine Heinlein
 2011: Barbara Cameron
 2011: Starre Vartan (runner-up)
 2012: Robert Long Foreman
 2012: Vernita Hall (runner-up)

Fiction
 Mary L. Tabor (spring 1999)
 Melissa Jeanne Miller (1956–1991)
 2008: Michael Isaac Shokrian
 2009: Marylee MacDonald
 2010: Karen Heuler
 2010: Nora Khan (runner-up)
 2010: Emily McLaughlin (runner-up)
 2011: Marc Dickinson
 2011: Sean Madigan Hoen (runner-up)
 2012: Lydia Kann (runner-up)
 2012: Dustin Parsons

Poetry
 1990: Sheryl St. Germain
 1997: Renée Ashley
 1998: Debora L. Innocenti
 2001: Sam Witt
 2007: Jeffrey Levine
 2008: Roy Bentley
 2009: Arthur Brown
 2010: Jude Nutter
 2011: Joseph Duemer
 2012: Eileen G'Sell
 2012: Allan Peterson (runner-up)

Editors 
ALR is largely student-run with UNT creative writing faculty editorial oversight.

Editor-in-chief
 unknown–present: Jehanne Dubrow †
Fiction co-editors
 2009–present: Miro Penkov
 2009–present: Barbara Rodman, PhD
Creative nonfiction editor
 2008-present: Bonnie Friedman
Poetry co-editors
 1995–present: Bruce Bond, PhD †
 2000–present: Corey Marks, PhD

Former editors-in-chief
 James Ward Lee, PhD † (founding editor)
 Scott Cairns, PhD
 Barbara Rodman, PhD
 William J. Cobb, PhD
 Corey Marks, PhD
 John Tait, PhD
 Miro Penkov

Former Poetry editor
 Nancy Eimers
Former advisory board members
 1990–1997: John Henry Irsfeld †

Notes † Member, Texas Institute of Letters

Submissions 
ALR seeks literary mainstream, creative nonfiction, and poetry.  , it was receiving 150 to 200 unsolicited manuscripts a month and accepts 12 to 16 per issue.  Submissions are reviewed from October 1 to May 1 and published within two years of acceptance.  In round one of the referee process, judges, which include graduate students, read all submissions and make preliminary selections.  Faculty editors for each category review make final selections for official recognition and publishing. Separate judges for prizes in each category then make their selection.  At all stages of the process, the identity of writers is not known by referees.

See also 

 List of literary magazines

Bygone publications of the same name 
 The American Literary Review of Newton, Massachusetts, was a privately owned quarterly literary magazine. It was edited by Lee Bates Hatfield (born 1953). The publication ran from 1973 to 1983. Its holding company was a Massachusetts non-profit corporation of the same name, "The American Literary Review, Inc."
 The American Literary Review of New York City never existed.  Rather, it was proposed in 1931 as a review of books.  A prospectus for investors was copyrighted and is stored, along with other information, at the Widener Library of Harvard College.
 American Literary Review of Augusta, Maine, was a weekly literary and scientific newspaper founded in 1870 by LaForest Almond Shattuck, M.D. (1846–1930).  By May 1871, circulation had reached 75,000 and covered every state and territory.  Shattuck stepped down as editor 1871 due to poor health.

References 
Notes

Inline citations

External links
 
 Article: "A Portrait of Three UNT journals Illustrates Rewards, Challenges of Publishing," by Amelia Jaycen, UNT Office of Research and Economic Development

1990 establishments in Texas
2013 disestablishments in Texas
Biannual magazines published in the United States
Defunct literary magazines published in the United States
Magazines established in 1990
Magazines disestablished in 2013
Magazines published in Texas
Online literary magazines published in the United States
Online magazines with defunct print editions
Poetry magazines published in the United States
Poetry publishers
University of North Texas
Mass media in the Dallas–Fort Worth metroplex